Marius Ndiaye stadium (Stade Marius Ndiaye) is an indoor arena in Dakar, Senegal, used primarily for basketball. The arena was home to the FIBA Africa Championship for Women 2007 in September 2007. It was also used to host the 29th FIBA Africa Basketball Championship in 2017.

References

Sports venues in Senegal
Buildings and structures in Dakar
Basketball venues in Senegal
Indoor arenas in Senegal
Sport in Dakar